The Littlest Outlaw is a 1955 drama film produced by Walt Disney. It was released by Buena Vista Distribution on December 22, 1955. It was directed by Roberto Gavaldón and written by Larry Lansburgh (story), and Bill Walsh (screenplay).

It starred  Pedro Armendáriz as Gen. Torres, Joseph Calleia as the Padre, and Andrés Velázquez as Pablito.

Plot 

Little Pablito is the ten-year-old stepson of a cruel horse trainer. The trainer is responsible for training a Mexican general's horse to jump for the grand race. The trainer's methods cause the horse to become afraid of jumping and the general orders the animal's death. Pablito runs away with the horse, becoming a fugitive. He travels throughout Mexico encountering several fugitives and a priest who tries to help.

Cast 
Pedro Armendáriz as Gen. Torres
Joseph Calleia as Padre
Rodolfo Acosta as Chato
Andrés Velázquez as Pablito
Laila Maley as Celita
Pepe Ortiz as Himself
Gilberto González as Tiger
José Torvay as Vulture
Jorge Treviño as Barber
José Ángel Espinoza as Señor Garcia
Enriqueta Zazueta as Señor Garcia
Irving Lee as Gypsy 
Carlos Ortigoza as Doctor
Margarito Luna as Silvestre 
Ricardo Gonzáles as Marcos

Production 

Larry Lansburgh had been at the Walt Disney Studios for approximately 10 years when he submitted the story treatment for The Littlest Outlaw. At the time, Lansburgh had directed several short films for Disney, mostly simple stories about animals. Bill Walsh expanded the treatment into a screenplay and Lansburgh was retained as producer.

The entire film was shot in Mexico, mostly around San Miguel Allende, with a bilingual English/Spanish cast. Because of this, the film was shot twice, once in English and once in Spanish, enabling it to be released directly into Spanish-speaking markets without the usual dubbing process.

Reception 

The Littlest Outlaw received a mildly critical reception. Variety spoke well of the child star Andres Velasquez, but most critics dismissed the film as a routine affair.

See also
List of American films of 1955

References

External links
  

1955 films
1955 drama films
American drama films
Films about horses
Films directed by Roberto Gavaldón
Films set in Mexico
Films shot in Mexico
Walt Disney Pictures films
1950s American films